"(I Don't Need You To) Set Me Free" is the third single by alternative rock group Grinderman, and final single from their eponymous debut album, Grinderman. Much like their first single "Get It On", the single is a special A-side only release.

Critical reception
The single did not receive as much acclaim as the band's previous two singles, with Pitchfork Media stating that:
the measured soul of "(I Don't Need You to) Set Me Free" and the familiar melodrama [...] are prime Cave, but each marks a slight deviation from the Grinderman aesthetic. They're just a little too classy, too neat, despite the roaring undercurrent of musical violence in the last, which picks up right before the song cuts off.

Track listing
 European 7" single (MUTE 381)
 "(I Don't Need You To) Set Me Free" - 3:36

Musicians and personnel
 Nick Cave – lead vocals, electric guitar, organ, piano, artwork
 Warren Ellis – acoustic guitar, viola, violin, electric bouzouki, electric mandolin, backing vocals
 Martyn Casey – bass, acoustic guitar, backing vocals
 Jim Sclavunos – drums, percussion, backing vocals
 Nick Launay – producer, engineer
 Grinderman - additional production
 Stuart Hawkes - mastering

References

2007 songs
Songs written by Nick Cave
Song recordings produced by Nick Launay
Mute Records singles